Fairy Gold is a 1926 novel by the British writer Compton Mackenzie. A Cornish knight living on an island, who has lost his son during the First World War, resents a young English soldier stationed nearby.

References

Bibliography
 David Joseph Dooley. Compton Mackenzie. Twayne Publishers, 1974.
 Andro Linklater. Compton Mackenzie: A Life Hogarth Press, 1992.

External links

1926 British novels
Novels by Compton Mackenzie
Novels set in Scotland
Cassell (publisher) books
George H. Doran Company books